The Ninth Malaysian Plan, abbreviated as '9MP', is a comprehensive blueprint prepared by the Economic Planning Unit (EPU) of the Prime Minister's Department and the Finance Ministry of Malaysia with approval by the Cabinet of Malaysia. The plan allocates the national budget from 2006 to 2010 in regard to all economic sectors in Malaysia.

The blueprint was announced on 31 March 2006, and was unveiled by the fifth Prime Minister of Malaysia, Datuk Seri Abdullah Ahmad Badawi in Parliament.

The economic development plan was unveiled at a time when Malaysia was starting to recover from the Asian financial crisis and challenging economic conditions as a result of high oil prices. The US-led Iraq invasion in 2003 resulted in a rise in oil prices to about US$60/barrel by August 2005, which was a few months before the plan was unveiled. These two factors were mentioned in Prime Minister's speech when tabling the Ninth Malaysia Plan on 31 March 2008 besides SARS, bird flu, and the 2004 Boxing Day earthquake and tsunami.

Overview 
The plan envisages Malaysia's GDP to grow (in real terms) by 6.0% per annum over the 2006 to 2010 period, and highlights five ways for Malaysia to move forward economically. These thrusts are:
 To move the economy up the value chain
 To raise the capacity for knowledge and innovation and to nurture a 'first class mentality'
 To address socio-economic inequalities constructively and productively
 To improve the standard and sustainability of quality life
 To strengthen institutional and implementation capacity

Highlight issues of 9MP

Infrastructure 
 RM1500 bil savings from privatisation
 RM101111 bil for Iskandar Region Development Authority (IRDA)
 RM3.58 bil for building and upgrading rural roads
 RM29 bil for biotechnology (physical and soft infrastructures)
 RM11 bil for upgrading and extension of KKIA, second low cost hub for Malaysia
 Additional runway and satellite building for KLIA
 Double tracking at selected priority stretches
 An upgraded works of Pasir Gudang Highway and the construction of Johor Bahru Eastern Dispersal Link

Health 
 RM10.28 bil for disease prevention
 RM2.3 bil for setting up National Institute of Cancer, National Forensic Institute and National Institute for Oral Health
 Eight new hospitals to be built...

Environment 
 RM510 mil for cleaning, preserving and beautifying rivers
 RM4 bil for flood mitigation projects

Agriculture 
 RM4.4 bil for modernising agriculture farming
 RM2.6 bil for support services
 RM1.5 bil for agricultural irrigation programmes
 Revitalising cocoa industry
 RM1 bil for growing more trees

Education 
 RM 690 mil for teachers' accommodation or housing quarters
 RM 143 mil quarters in remote areas of Sabah & Sarawak
 Universities for the states of Terengganu and Kelantan
 180 primary, 229 secondary and full boarding schools to be built

Culture, arts and heritage 
 RM11.62 mil less for culture

Mid Term Review 
Mid-term review was tabled in Parliament on 26 June 2008. An additional MYR30 billion has been allocated to the plan, making the total allocation MYR230 billion. The extra MYR30 billion spending  will be spent on:-
 RM 10 billion for corridor initiatives
 RM 2 billion for Sabah and Sarawak development
 RM 3 billion for food security
 RM 3 billion for Strategic Investment Fund
 RM 2 billion for double tracking rail projects between Ipoh and Padang Besar and Seremban and Gemas
 RM 2 billion for additional rural infrastructure
 RM 1.6 billion for public transportation
 RM 1 billion for low-cost and medium-cost housing
 RM 500 million for high impact education fund.

References

External links 
 Ninth Malaysia Plan report by Economic Planning Unit
 Mid-Term Review of the Ninth Malaysia Plan

Five-year plans of Malaysia